Vyron is a given name. Notable people with the name include:
 Vyron Athanasiadis (1900–unknown), Greek long-distance runner
 Vyron Brown, American football coach
 Vyron Pallis (1923–1995), Greek actor
 Vyron Polydoras (born 1947), Greek politician

See also
 

Greek-language given names